The Grande Prairie Storm is a junior A ice hockey team in the Alberta Junior Hockey League (AJHL) based in Grande Prairie, Alberta, Canada, with home games at Revolution Place.

History
The organization was founded in 1966 as the Junior Athletics as a member of the Peace Junior B Hockey League (PJHL). The team rebranded around 1972 as the Grande Prairie North Stars. When the Quesnel Millionaires and Prince George Spruce Kings joined the league in 1975, the league became the Peace-Cariboo Junior Hockey League (PCJHL).  In 1980, the league and teams were promoted to Junior A. The North Stars were financially struggling and sat out two seasons from 1989 to 1991.  They came back as the Grande Prairie Chiefs in 1991, but the league had brought in teams from the Kootenay International Junior Hockey League and reformed as the Rocky Mountain Junior Hockey League (RMJHL).

In 1995, with the Chiefs continuing to have financial difficulties, a community-led group bought the team with the goal of paying off its $150,000 in debts and restoring junior A hockey to prominence in the Peace Country. The team rebranded as the Grande Prairie Storm and moved to a brand new arena, the Canada Games Arena, built for the 1995 Canada Winter Games.

In 1996, the Storm moved from the RMJHL to the Alberta Junior Hockey League (AJHL).  The Storm qualified for the AJHL post season in each of its first 18 consecutive seasons before missing in 2014. In 2004, the Storm won their first AJHL championship. They also hosted the 2004 Royal Bank Cup national junior A championship tournament that season, where they lost in the semifinals.

The Storm have been a major success off the ice as well as the franchise perennially leads the AJHL in attendance, and often leads the entire Canadian Junior A Hockey League in attendance. The Storm broke the previous attendance record for the Royal Bank Cup by over 9000 fans in 2004.

Season-by-season record
Note: GP = Games played, W = Wins, L = Losses, T/OTL = Ties/Overtime losses, SOL = Shootout losses, Pts = Points, GF = Goals for, GA = Goals against

Junior A National Championship
The National Junior A Championship, known as the Centennial Cup and formerly as the Royal Bank Cup or RBC Cup, is the postseason tournament for the Canadian national championship for Junior A hockey teams that are members of the Canadian Junior Hockey League. The tournament consists of the regional Junior A champions and a previously selected host team. Since 1990, the national championship has used a five-team tournament format when the regional qualifiers were designated as the ANAVET Cup (Western), Doyle Cup (Pacific), Dudley Hewitt Cup (Central), and Fred Page Cup (Eastern). From 2013 to 2017, the qualifiers were the Dudley Hewitt Cup (Central), Fred Page Cup (Eastern), and the Western Canada Cup champions and runners-up.

The tournament begins with round-robin play between the five teams followed by the top four teams playing a semifinal game, with the top seed facing the fourth seed and the second facing the third. The winners of the semifinals then face each other in final game for the national championship. In some years, the losers of the semifinal games face each other for a third place game.

League awards

Player awards
2018 AJHL Rookie of the Year — Zachary Okabe

Team awards
2004 AJHL Champions
2009 AJHL Champions

NHL alumni
The following former Storm have gone on to play in the NHL:

Logan Thompson
Tanner Fritz
Carter Rowney
Grant Stevenson

See also
 List of ice hockey teams in Alberta

References

External links
Grande Prairie Storm website
Alberta Junior Hockey League website

Alberta Junior Hockey League teams
Ice hockey teams in Alberta
Sport in Grande Prairie
Ice hockey clubs established in 1966
1966 establishments in Alberta